The Difference Between the Democritean and Epicurean Philosophy of Nature is a book written by German philosopher Karl Marx as his university thesis. Completed in 1841, it was on the basis of this work that he earned his PhD. The thesis is a comparative study on atomism of Democritus and Epicurus on contingency and dedicated to Marx's friend, mentor, and future father-in-law Ludwig von Westphalen. It was described as "a daring and original piece of work in which Marx set out to show that theology must yield to the superior wisdom of philosophy". His thesis advisor was his fellow Young Hegelian and personal friend, Bruno Bauer.

References

External links
The text at the Marxists Internet Archive (French mirror)

1841 non-fiction books
Books by Karl Marx
Ancient Greek philosophy studies
Theses